Robert Norris is an American politician from the state of Vermont who currently serves as a member of the Vermont House of Representatives from the Franklin-4 district. He is running for the Vermont Senate to represent the Franklin County district. He previously served as the sheriff of Franklin County.

References

Living people
Republican Party members of the Vermont House of Representatives
21st-century American politicians
Year of birth missing (living people)